Events from the year 1313 in Ireland.

Incumbent
 Lord: Edward II

Events
 Stephen Riddel appointed Lord Chancellor of Ireland.

Deaths
 Walter de Thornbury, an English-born statesman and cleric who held the office of Lord Chancellor of Ireland; his efforts to secure confirmation of his election as Archbishop of Dublin were cut short by his death in a shipwreck.

Births

References

 
1310s in Ireland
Ireland
Years of the 14th century in Ireland